Giovanni Rasponi (1646–1714) was an Italian Roman Catholic prelate who served as Bishop of Forlì (1689–1714).

Biography
Giovanni Rasponi was born in Ravenna, Italy and ordained a priest on 27 Feb 1689.
On 28 Feb 1689, he was appointed during the papacy of Pope Innocent XI as Bishop of Forlì.
On 20 Mar 1689, he was consecrated bishop by Flavio Chigi (seniore), Cardinal-Bishop of Albano, with Muzio Dandini, Bishop of Senigallia, and Stefano Giuseppe Menatti, Titular Bishop of Cyrene, serving as co-consecrators. 
He served as Bishop of Forlì until his death on 31 Aug 1714.

While bishop, he was the principal co-consecrator of Andrea Santacroce, Titular Archbishop of Seleucia in Isauria (1690).

References

External links 
 (for Chronology of Bishops) 
 (for Chronology of Bishops)  

18th-century Italian Roman Catholic bishops
Bishops appointed by Pope Innocent XI
1646 births
1714 deaths
People from Ravenna
Bishops of Forlì
17th-century Italian Roman Catholic bishops